was an unstaffed railway station on the Tadami Line in Tadami, Fukushima, Japan, operated by East Japan Railway Company (JR East). It opened in 1971 and closed in March 2013.

The station was located by National Route 252 and beside Lake Tagokura. There are no shops or residences within miles of the station. The main users of the station were mountain climbers.

History
Tagokura Station opened on 29 August 1971, and was unstaffed from the start. From December 2001, the station was closed during the winter season between December and March.

From the start of the revised timetable on 16 March 2013, the station closed permanently, due to low passenger usage—being used on average by roughly one person per day.

Gallery

References

Railway stations in Japan opened in 1971
Railway stations in Fukushima Prefecture
Railway stations closed in 2013
2013 disestablishments in Japan